Swanson Group Aviation, formerly Superior Helicopter, is a helicopter operating company based in Glendale, Oregon, United States.

SGA operates a fleet of Kaman K-MAX helicopters. It an after sales support pilot and engineer services division for aerial firefighting, aerial construction and unmanned aircraft support.

SGA was one of the original launch customers of the Kaman K-MAX, and supported the USMC in Afghanistan with their partners Kaman and Lockheed Martin with UAS Kmax. The company is considered one of the most experienced operators of this model, having logged over 80,000 flight hours as of 2015.

See also
 Seaside Heliport

References

External links
 Swanson Group website
 Previous company website
 Swanson Group Aviation on Airliners.net

Helicopter operators
Companies based in Oregon
Companies established in 1995
Douglas County, Oregon
Aerial firefighting
Logging
Privately held companies based in Oregon
1995 establishments in Oregon
Helicopter airlines